The 2005 World Wheelchair Curling Championship was held from January 17 to 22 in Braehead, Glasgow, Scotland.

Teams

Group A

Group B

Round-robin standings

Round-robin results

Group A

Draw 1
Monday, January 17, 13:30

Draw 2
Tuesday, January 18, 9:30

Draw 3
Tuesday, January 18, 16:30

Draw 4
Wednesday, January 19, 9:30

Draw 5
Wednesday, January 19, 16:30

Draw 6
Thursday, January 20, 9:30

Draw 7
Thursday, January 20, 16:30

Group B

Draw 1
Monday, January 17, 17:00

Draw 2
Tuesday, January 18, 13:00

Draw 3
Tuesday, January 18, 20:00

Draw 4
Wednesday, January 19, 13:00

Draw 5
Wednesday, January 19, 20:00

Draw 6
Thursday, January 20, 13:00

Draw 7
Thursday, January 20, 20:00

Playoffs

Semifinals
Saturday, January 22, 10:00

Bronze medal game
Saturday, January 22, 14:00

Gold medal game
Saturday, January 22, 14:00

External links

2005 in curling
2005 in Scottish sport
International curling competitions hosted by Scotland
World Wheelchair Curling Championship